G. Harold Alexander (1900–1987) was a Florida politician who served as state chairman of the Florida Republican Party from 1952 to 1964. He served in the Florida House of Representatives.

The Florida Archives has a photo of him.

References 

1900 births
1987 deaths
People from Fort Myers, Florida
Florida Republicans